Nepal–South Korea relations refers to foreign relations between Nepal and South Korea.

History 
Nepal–South Korea relations were officially established on 15 May 1974. The same year, South Korea opened its embassy in Kathmandu, and Nepal opened its embassy in Seoul in 2007.

In 2016, Former Speaker of the National Assembly, Chung Ui-hwa visited Nepal, and similarly, Chairman of the National Assembly, Ganesh Prasad Timilsina visited South Korea in 2019.

In 2004, it was reported that there were more than 4,600 Nepali migrant workers in South Korea. The same year, it was also reported that more than 10,000 South Koreans visit Nepal, remarkably, 29,680 tourists visited Nepal in 2019.

South Korea provided US$1 million in humanitarian aid to Nepal following the April 2015 Nepal earthquake.

References 

Nepal–South Korea relations
Korea, South
Nepal